The men's water polo tournament at the 2007 World Aquatics Championships, organised by the FINA, was held in Melbourne, Australia from 19 March to 1 April 2007.

The men's tournament was won by Croatia who won all of their matches and beat Hungary 9–8 in the final game.

Participating teams

Groups formed

Group A
 
 
 
 

Group B
 
 
 
 

Group C
 
 
 
 

Group D

Preliminary round

Group A

Group B

Group C

Group D

Final round

Finals

5th-8th place

9th-12th place

13th-16th place

Final ranking

Medalists

Croatia, Hungary and Spain qualified for the 2008 Summer Olympics in Beijing, PR China

Individual awards

 Most Valuable Player

 Best Goalkeeper

 Topscorer
 — 19 goals

References

External links
 12th FINA World Championships 2007 FINA Water Polo website
 Melbourne 2007
 Men Water Polo World Championship 2007 Melbourne www.todor66.com

2007
Water Polo
Men's tournament
2007